Eulasiona is a genus of bristle flies in the family Tachinidae.

Species
Eulasiona aperta (Reinhard, 1958)
Eulasiona cinerea (Curran, 1934)
Eulasiona comstocki Townsend, 1892
Eulasiona fasciata (Curran, 1934)
Eulasiona fumator (Reinhard, 1958)
Eulasiona genalis (Townsend, 1915)
Eulasiona luteipennis Mesnil, 1963
Eulasiona nigra Curran, 1924
Eulasiona unispinosa (Coquillett, 1898)
Eulasiona urtamira Herting, 1973
Eulasiona vagabunda (Wulp, 1890)
Eulasiona zimini Mesnil, 1963

References

Dexiinae
Diptera of Europe
Diptera of Asia
Diptera of North America
Tachinidae genera
Taxa named by Charles Henry Tyler Townsend